Donald William Rutledge, OBE JP, 7 August 1891 – 1956, was an ANZAC who served for New Zealand during World War I in Samoa, Gallipoli and France. He was born in Dunedin, eldest son of Barret Rutledge (born Lyttelton, of Irish descent) and Elizabeth Donaldson (born in Edinburgh).

Military service 

Rutledge was 23 and living in Wellesley Street, Auckland, when on 8 August 1914 he enlisted with the 1st New Zealand Expeditionary Force, Auckland Infantry Battalion, and was assigned Regimental Number 12/2560. Prior to living in Auckland he had been in Wellington and served in the Wellington Highland Rifles, B Company, 5th Regiment.

Departing New Zealand on 15 August 1914 as part of the 1370 strong Samoa Expeditionary Force, which experienced New Zealand's first action in World War I, he took part in the capture of Samoa from the Germans. The British government had indicated it would be a great and urgent Imperial service if New Zealand forces seized the German wireless station near Apia which was one of several radio stations used by the German East Asia Squadron. He returned to Wellington on the Tahune on 14 April 1915.

He embarked for Suez on 13 June 1915 as part of the New Zealand 5th Reinforcement in the Machine Gun Corps. He was in Egypt between 24 July and 6 August when he was shipped out to Gallipoli in Turkey to join the ANZAC troops fighting in the Gallipoli Campaign. He was wounded and admitted to St David's hospital in Malta and left for England on 25 August for hospitalisation in Birmingham. He was discharged from hospital on 1 October and returned to the Dardanelles on 7 December 1915, being attached to the "miners" the next day.

He arrived in Alexandria on 29 December 1915 and was then posted to the Egyptian Expeditionary Force.

Rutledge was shipped to France on 7 April 1916. He was again wounded, on 16 June, and shipped from Wimereux Hospital for London on 2 July 1916. He was discharged from hospital and transferred to Hornchurch on 27 July before returning to France with the NZ Machine Gun Company No 4 in February 1917. He was seriously wounded on 7 June 1917 and shipped back to England on the fourteenth for treatment at the No 2 NZ General Hospital in Walton. He was classified as being unfit for military duty by a Medical Board on 13 October 1917 and embarked for New Zealand from Avonmouth on the New Zealand Hospital Ship "SS Marama" on 21 November 1917, arriving in New Zealand on 27 December.

He was discharged from the New Zealand Army on 28 March 1918 after 3 years and 232 days of active service of which 153 days were in New Zealand.

Decorations in recognition of service issued on 1 August 1921 were the 1914–15 Star, British War Medal and Victory Medal

Community service 

Rutledge was a member of the Kaitaia Town Board and a foundation member of the Kaitaia Returned Services Association (RSA). He became a Life Member of the Auckland Returned Services Association having been a member of the executive for many years.

After 1938 Rutledge became a member of the Point Chevalier School Committee and in appreciation of his many years of service, the school's new assembly hall was named the "Rutledge Hall' at its opening in 1955. He was appointed Chairman of the Auckland Education Board's Training College Committee and a member of the Finance Committee and President of the Auckland School Committee's Association in 1954 and 1955. He became the Deputy Chairman of the Auckland Education Board from 1955 till his death. He was a member of the Point Chevalier Masonic Lodge No. 303.

He was appointed a justice of the peace in 1946.

Queen Elizabeth II invested Rutledge with his Officer of the Order of the British Empire (OBE) for services to the community in the Wellington Town Hall on 12 January 1954 during her Royal Tour.

He died at the Port Albert farm of Colleen and Max Reid in 1956.

Family 
Donald Rutledge married Mary Gatland at St Columbia Church of England, Grey Lynn, Auckland on 22 November 1922.  The married couple lived in Kaitaia, Northland where their family were born and Donald operated a business in town, from 1923 until 1938, when because of his war injuries he retired and moved to Point Chevalier, Auckland.

References

External links 
 Donald William Rutledge at Online Cenotaph
 Archives New Zealand – RUTLEDGE, Donald William – WW1 12/2560 – Army. Record Number (R20808910)
 NZ RSA Gallipoli "an abridged version of the Gallipoli Diary from Major Fred Waite DSO, The New Zealanders at Gallipoli (1919") 
 New Zealand RSA ANZAC Remembrance Day 
 Capture of German Samoa
 New Zealand and the First World War – Gallipoli and the Balkans

1891 births
1956 deaths
New Zealand military personnel of World War I
New Zealand people of World War I
Burials at Waikumete Cemetery
New Zealand Officers of the Order of the British Empire
Military personnel from Dunedin